Pet Food Express is a California chain of retail stores that offers pet food, with a focus on premium brands, holistic, and organic pet food, as well as other pet supplies, and self-service dog washing facilities.

Pet Food Express CEO and co-owner Michael Levy started a dog training business in 1976 and opened his first San Francisco location in 1980, selling some food and supplies. In 1986, he left dog training to focus on retail and had expanded to three locations by the time his business partner, Mark Witriol, came aboard in 1992. They have since expanded, and have 54 locations in Northern California, with 9 more in Southern California.

Pet Food Express partners with more than 250 non-profit animal rescue and shelter organizations, and regularly donate more than $1 million a year to those organizations. The company set up cat adoption centers in its stores starting in 2011 and claims that approximately 1,000 cats have been adopted through its California stores since the program's inception. Pet Food Express has a high standard of quality for its food and products.

References

External links

American companies established in 1986
Retail companies established in 1986
Online retailers of the United States
Companies based in Oakland, California
Pet stores
1986 establishments in California
Retail companies based in California
Pets in the United States
Food and drink companies based in California